The  or , Latinized as  or , was a senior official in the Byzantine bureaucracy.

The post evolved gradually. The first  are attested from the 6th century, and several Ecumenical Patriarchs of Constantinople and one emperor, Anastasios II, were drawn from their ranks. Aside from possibly anachronistic references to Maximus the Confessor being a  under Emperor Heraclius, the earliest confirmed occurrence (as ) comes from the Liber Pontificalis for the year 756. Among others, the Patriarch Photios (858–867 and 877–886) held the post.

The  seems also to have been in charge of preparing the imperial chrysobulls.

References

Sources

 
 
 

Byzantine administrative offices